John Peers and Michael Venus were the defending champions, but chose not to participate this year.

Nicolas Mahut and Fabrice Martin won the title, defeating Wesley Koolhof and Jean-Julien Rojer in the final, 6–0, 6–1.

Seeds

Draw

Draw

References

External links
 Main Draw

European Open - Doubles
2021 Doubles